Margaret of Bohemia (1313–1341) was the daughter of King John of Bohemia by his first wife Elizabeth of Bohemia.

Family 
Margaret was an elder sister of the future Holy Roman Emperor Charles IV, who was crowned in 1349. Margaret's maternal grandparents were Wenceslaus II of Bohemia and his first wife, Judith of Habsburg. Her paternal grandparents were, Henry VII, Holy Roman Emperor and his wife Margaret of Brabant. When Margaret was about seventeen, her mother died. Her father decided to remarry, he married Beatrice of Bourbon. They had a son, Wencesluas, who succeeded his father in Luxembourg. Her other siblings included Bonne (wife of John II of France), John Henry, Margrave of Moravia and Anna (wife of Otto, Duke of Austria)

Marriage 
She married Henry XIV, Duke of Bavaria in Straubing on 12 August 1328. 
Her children with Henry XIV of Bavaria were:
John I, Duke of Bavaria (1329–1340)
Henry of Wittelsbach (born 1330, died young).

Margaret's husband had conflicts with his brother Otto IV (died 1334) and his cousin Henry XV, Duke of Bavaria on the partition of their lands worsened the relationship between the emperor and Henry XIV, who allied with Margaret's father, John. Some months after the reconciliation with Louis IV in February 1339 Henry died from leprosy  and was succeeded by his eldest son, John I, Duke of Bavaria. With the death of Duke John I in 1340 Louis IV, Holy Roman Emperor inherited Lower Bavaria and then reunited the duchy of Bavaria. Margaret of Bohemia, as a member of the Luxemburg dynasty, then had to return to Bohemia.

Ancestors

External links 

House of Luxembourg
Bohemian princesses
1313 births
1341 deaths
14th-century Bohemian women
14th-century Bohemian people
14th-century German nobility
14th-century German women
Daughters of kings